Bryan Glacier is a glacier that flows south from a divide with Papitashvili Valley in the Apocalypse Peaks of Victoria Land. Named after John Bryan, an Australian coal geologist who led a party in mapping the Permian coal measures at Mount Fleming, Shapeless Mountain, and Mount Electra during one visit in 1982–83.

References

Glaciers of Victoria Land